Robert Porter McKimson Sr. (October 13, 1910 – September 29, 1977) was an American animator and illustrator, best known for his work on the Looney Tunes and Merrie Melodies series of cartoons from Warner Bros. Cartoons and later DePatie–Freleng Enterprises. He wrote and directed many animated cartoon shorts starring Bugs Bunny, Daffy Duck, Porky Pig, Foghorn Leghorn, Hippety Hopper, and The Tasmanian Devil, among other characters. He was also well known for defining Bugs Bunny's design in the 1943 short Tortoise Wins by a Hare.

Career 
Born in Denver, Colorado, McKimson spent ten years gaining an art education at the Lukits School of Art. The McKimson family moved to California in 1926 and he then worked for Walt Disney as an assistant animator to Dick Lundy, stayed with Disney's studio for a year and then joined the Romer Grey Studio located in Altadena, California, in 1930, a would-be animation shop started by the son of Western author Zane Grey, and financed by Zane Grey's wife. Several cartoons were animated at the Romer Grey Studio, but due to the Great Depression, the studio was unable to close a distribution deal. None of the shorts were released, with only a handful of them being completed (only one of them is known to exist today).

At the same time he began working for Grey, McKimson was hired by Hugh Harman and Rudolf Ising, first doing the ink-and-paint duties for the first Looney Tunes, then becoming an in-betweener before becoming an animator by 1931, when the Romer Grey Studio shut down. At that time he had an accident that gave him a concussion. As a result, he was able to visualize better, thus increasing his production and animation. He was the head animator and go-to guy in the late 1930s at the studio, which overwhelmed him. Eventually he worked exclusively with Bob Clampett. He was offered a directorial position by Leon Schlesinger in 1938, but declined, allowing the position to go to animator Chuck Jones. He accepted his own directorial position in late 1944, when Frank Tashlin left Warner Bros. to direct live-action films.

McKimson's first Warner Bros. cartoon that he finished, The Return of Mr. Hook, was released in 1945 exclusively for the US Navy. His first theatrical short, Daffy Doodles, was released in early April 1946. His third theatrical short entitled Acrobatty Bunny would be the first Bugs Bunny short Mckimson directed. It was released in June 1946. His's better known efforts would include Hillbilly Hare, A-Lad-In His Lamp, Stupor Duck, The Windblown Hare, Walky Talky Hawky, and Big Top Bunny.

McKimson created characters like Foghorn Leghorn and the Tasmanian Devil, as well as directing every Hippety Hopper/Sylvester pairing. He also created Speedy Gonzales for the 1953 short Cat-Tails for Two and directed many others periodically (along with Freleng and other directors) for the remainder of his theatrical career.

In June 1953, the Warner Bros. cartoon studio was shut down for a period of six months due to the 3-D fad at the time, which Jack Warner found to be too costly a process to use for animated cartoons. McKimson's unit however was disbanded entirely two months before the shutdown. He would make Oldsmobile commercial at Cascade Studios around this time. After the studio re-opened, Freleng and Jones quickly re-assembled their respective units, but there was no indication if McKimson and his unit would be brought back. McKimson was able to convince Warner Bros. to reopening his unit, albeit at the cost of pay cuts. Apart from writer Tedd Pierce, background painter Richard H. Thomas and animator Keith Darling (who worked uncredited for McKimson prior to the 1953 closure), he was unable to hire back most of his animators, including Rod Scribner and his own brother Charles McKimson. At the start of this period, McKimson animated on four of his own shorts, The Hole Idea (in fact, he was the sole animator credited on The Hole Idea), Dime to Retire, Too Hop to Handle (along with uncredited work from Jones' animator Ben Washam), and Weasel Stop (where McKimson had no animation credit). Soon, McKimson assembled a new team of artists, including layout man/background painter Robert Gribbroek (formerly of Jones' unit) plus animators Warren Batchelder, Ted Bonnicksen, George Grandpré and Tom Ray. Russ Dyson briefly worked with Mckimson in 1956 until Dyson's death that year. 

His office in the Termite Terrace studio was on the second floor.

Later career 
McKimson continued working at Warner's Cartoon Studio as it began to lose staff (including such key personnel as Jones) in the early 1960s. According to an interview with his son, he generally did not like how things were going at the studio and missed full animation, as well as disliking the new characters in the new shorts.  Over this time, he directed his share of shorts and worked on the feature The Incredible Mr. Limpet with Hawley Pratt, taking over the role of director from Bill Tytla due to his illness.

After the studio closed, he joined DePatie-Freleng Enterprises, co-owned by his old associate Friz Freleng and David H. DePatie, who had been a producer at the Warners studio. At DePatie-Freleng, McKimson directed several The Inspector shorts and worked on some of the Looney Tunes and Merrie Melodies contracted out to DePatie-Freleng by Warner Bros. In 1967, Warner opened its animation studio again, McKimson re-joining its staff in 1968, but the studio was shut down again in 1969. His last Warner Bros. cartoon was Injun Trouble with Cool Cat. It was shortlisted for an Academy Award, but wasn't nominated. Injun Trouble was also the last of the original Looney Tunes or Merrie Melodies cartoon to be produced before the Warner Bros. cartoon studio was closed. McKimson was the one person to be at the studio from the start of the Looney Tunes series through its finish in 1969, first as an animator and then as a director.

After a sabbatical, he went back to DePatie-Freleng in 1972 to direct The Pink Panther Show shorts, among their other series.

Death 
On the morning of September 27, McKimson's doctor declared him in good health for a 66-year-old (despite having a case of emphysema after years of smoking), and, according to Friz Freleng, McKimson then referred to his family history of living past 90 and bragged, "I'm going to be around after you guys are gone!". On September 29, 1977, while having lunch with Freleng and another co-worker, David H. DePatie, McKimson suffered a sudden heart attack and died, two weeks before his 67th birthday. At the time of his death, he had recently completed directing Misterjaw and had begun work on Baggy Pants and the Nitwits.

McKimson's body was buried at Forest Lawn Cemetery in Glendale, California.

Personal life 
McKimson's wife, Viola, died in 1963. In addition to being an animator, McKimson was a skilled horseman and polo player, a dedicated bowler, and a Master Mason. He played polo from 1932 until after the outbreak of war in 1942. His brothers Tom and Charles McKimson also worked as animators, as did two sisters, Anabel and Aylce McKimson. The younger brother, Charles, was frequently part of McKimson's unit at Warner Bros.

References

External links 
 Lambiek Comiclopedia article
 

1910 births
1977 deaths
American animators
Artists from Denver
Burials at Forest Lawn Memorial Park (Glendale)
Walt Disney Animation Studios people
Warner Bros. Cartoons directors
American Freemasons
Comedy film directors
Parody film directors
American parodists